Home Page Reader (Hpr) was a computer program, a self-voicing web browser designed for people who are blind. It was developed by IBM from the work of Chieko Asakawa at IBM Japan.

The screen reader met World Wide Web Consortium (W3C) HTML 4.01 specifications, Web Content Accessibility Guidelines 1.0 and User Agent Accessibility Guidelines 1.0.

In 2006, it was announced on the Hpr mailing list that IBM does not have plans for any further updates of HPR and the software was subsequently withdrawn from sale by IBM in December 2006. IBM has given code to be used as a Firefox extension.

The program also had a peer-support mailing list.

Criticism
In summer 2002 a non-scientific study concluded that Hpr did not make any distinction between the built-in keyboard shortcuts for entering different modes and the access keys available on websites. The research claimed that Hprs would do better to use links mode to cycle through a list.

System requirements

Hardware Requirements
Hpr had the following hardware requirements:
  166 MHz processor
 32 MB RAM Windows 95/98; 64 MB RAM for Windows NT
 14 MB hard disk space; 42 MB hard disk space for HPR and Netscape Communicator
 SVGA (640 X 480, 256 colors) graphics
 Windows compatible: modem (28.8 KBPS), sound card (16-bit), and CD ROM drive (quad-speed)
 Integrated or separately attached numeric keypad

Software Requirements

Hpr had the following software requirements:
 Microsoft Windows 95, 98 or NT 4.0
 Internet service provider (ISP) connection
 Netscape Navigator Version 3.01 or higher
 For Home Page Mailer, Microsoft Personal Web Server, Version 4.02 required for Windows 95/98; Peer Web Services, Version 4.0 required for Windows NT
 A mail program set up with preferences, or Microsoft Personal Web Server or Peer Web Services required for mailto: tags

References
Notes

References

External links
 
 
 HomePage reader @ evolt.
 HPR ftp directory, IBM
 IBM Home Page Reader Keyboard Shortcuts, WebAIM
 IBM Home Page Reader Tutorial, WebAIM

Discontinued web browsers
Home Page Reader
Windows web browsers
Internet Explorer shells
2002 software
Computer-related introductions in 2002